A consortium is an association of two or more entities with the objective of participating in a common activity or pooling their resources for achieving a common goal. The term may also refer to:
 Microbial consortium, a group of symbiotic microbes
 Loss of consortium, the deprivation of the benefits of a family relationship due to injuries caused by a tortfeasor
 Consortium (band), 1960s British band
 Consortium (video game), a game by Interdimensional Games.
 the Unicode Consortium
 Library consortium, a group of coordinated libraries